Patrick Hobbins (1832 – 1887) was a Democratic member of the Wisconsin State Assembly from 1874 to 1875. He was born on March 17, 1832, in County Tipperary, Ireland and later moved to Holland, Brown County, Wisconsin.

References

1832 births
1887 deaths
People from County Tipperary
Irish emigrants to the United States (before 1923)
People from Holland, Brown County, Wisconsin
19th-century American politicians
Democratic Party members of the Wisconsin State Assembly